The Rohrenkopf is a mountain,  high, in the Southern Black Forest in Germany. It rises within the parish of Gersbach, a village in the borough of Schopfheim.

Geography 
To the southwest is the county town (Kreisstadt) of Lörrach, 32 kilometres away.

The Rohrenkopf is Gersbach's highest point. In good weather the Swiss Alps may be seen, including the trio of the Eiger, Mönch and Jungfrau.

References 

Mountains and hills of Baden-Württemberg
Mountains and hills of the Black Forest
Lörrach (district)
Baden
One-thousanders of Germany